Tolj is a Croatian surname of a family originating from a small town called Greda in the district of Ljubuški in Bosnia and Herzegovina. 

The family name may refer to:
 Ivan Tolj (born 1982), Croatian scientist
 Marija Tolj (1999), Croatian athlete 
 Maya Tolj (born 1977), American scholar
 Miroslav Tolj, Croatian actor known for his role in Borat Subsequent Moviefilm 
 Samantha Tolj (born 1982), Australian actress
 Slaven Tolj (born 1964), Croatian multimedia artist
 Tonko Tony Tolj (born 1980), boxing icon, manager, promoter, agent, and matchmaker
Andrea Tolj (Born 1975),fashion designer Argentina